Jamelle Hagins (born October 19, 1990) is an American professional basketball player.

High school career
Hagins played high school basketball at William Fleming High School, in Roanoke, Virginia.

College career
After high school, Hagins played college basketball at the University of Delaware, with the Delaware Fightin' Blue Hens, from 2009 to 2013.

Professional career
Hagins began his professional career in France, in 2013, with the French Pro A League club Chorale Roanne. He then played with the NBA D-League team, the Rio Grande Valley Vipers, at the end of the 2013–14 season. During the 2014–15 season, he played with the Greek League club, Kolossos Rodou.

He moved to another Greek League club, Aris Thessaloniki, for the 2015–16 season.

On July 15, 2016, Hagins signed with Italian club Reyer Venezia Mestre.

On July 6, 2019, he has signed with Gaziantep of the Turkish Basketball Super League (BSL). 

On January 6, 2020, he has signed with OGM Ormanspor of the Basketbol Süper Ligi (BSL). Hagins signed a one-year contract extension with the team on May 23.

References

External links
FIBA Game Center Profile
Eurocup Profile
Washington Wizards Draft Profile
NBADraft.net Profile
Draftexpress.com Profile 
Eurobasket.com Profile

1990 births
Living people
Afyonkarahisar Belediyespor players
American expatriate basketball people in France
American expatriate basketball people in Greece
American expatriate basketball people in Italy
American expatriate basketball people in Turkey
American men's basketball players
Aris B.C. players
Basketball players from Virginia
Centers (basketball)
Chorale Roanne Basket players
Delaware Fightin' Blue Hens men's basketball players
Gaziantep Basketbol players
Kolossos Rodou B.C. players
Lega Basket Serie A players
Mersin Büyükşehir Belediyesi S.K. players
OGM Ormanspor players
Power forwards (basketball)
Reyer Venezia players
Rio Grande Valley Vipers players
Sportspeople from Roanoke, Virginia